The KTM Duke series is a family of standard motorcycles manufactured by KTM and Bajaj Auto Limited since from 1994.

Single-cylinder 
 125 Duke (2010–present)
 200 Duke (2012–present)
 250 Duke (2012–present)
 390 Duke (2013–present)
 690 Duke (2008–present)
 Duke 620 (1994–1997)
 Duke 640 (1998–2007)

Parallel-twin 
 790 Duke (2017–2020)
 890 Duke (2020–present)

V-twin 
 990 Super Duke (2004–2012)
 1290 Super Duke R (2013–present)
 1290 Super Duke GT (2016–present)

Gallery 

Duke
Standard motorcycles